Safa al-Ahmad is a Saudi Arabian journalist and filmmaker. She has directed documentaries for PBS and the BBC focusing on uprisings in the Middle East. On November 19, 2019, she was awarded the Wallenberg Medal at the University of Michigan.  She was the joint winner of the 2015 Index on Censorship Freedom of Expression Award for Journalism and was a finalist for the 2014 Sony Impact Award.

Career 
Safa started her career in field of documentary film-making. She rose to international fame when she participated on BBC Arabic by directing many documentaries since 2012 to date.

References

External links

"Biography at the international literature festival berlin"

Living people
Saudi Arabian journalists
Saudi Arabian film directors
Year of birth missing (living people)